Alan Wayne Burns (born 26 March 1961), also known by the nickname of "Frank", is a former Australian professional rugby league footballer who played in the 1980s.

Background
Burns was born in the Sydney suburb of North Sydney. His nickname of "Frank" comes from the M*A*S*H character Frank Burns.

References

1961 births
Living people
Australian rugby league players
North Sydney Bears players
Rugby league five-eighths
Rugby league locks
Rugby league players from Sydney
Rugby league second-rows
Sportsmen from New South Wales
Wakefield Trinity players
Western Suburbs Magpies players